Mark Hudson may refer to:
 Sir Mark Hudson (businessman) (born 1947), former Chairman of the Council of the Duchy of Lancaster
 Mark Hudson (author), winner of the NCR Book Award
 Mark Hudson (musician) (born 1951), record producer, musician and songwriter
 Mark Hudson (footballer, born 1980), English footballer currently with Shildon
 Mark Hudson (footballer, born 1982), English footballer currently with Huddersfield Town
 Mark J. Hudson (born 1963), anthropologist specializing in Japan
 Marc Hudson, lead singer for the English power metal band DragonForce